Lovin' Molly is a 1974 American drama film directed by Sidney Lumet and starring Anthony Perkins, Beau Bridges, Blythe Danner in the title role, Ed Binns, and Susan Sarandon. The film is based on one of Larry McMurtry's first novels, Leaving Cheyenne (1963).  Prior to release, the film was also known as Molly, Gid, and Johnny and The Wild and The Sweet.

In an interview with another of the actors in the film, Paul Partain (better known for his role in The Texas Chain Saw Massacre) described the origins of the film:When Sidney [Lumet] and producer Stephen J. Friedman got into town, they came with what they hoped would be the perfect formula for success. It had worked on The Last Picture Show, and they knew it would work here. It was this: get a Larry McMurtry novel, hire your three lead actors from Hollywood, get a great director, pick up all the rest of the actors and the crew from the local pool and you were set. Great plan, and it almost worked ...

The movie was filmed in Bastrop, Texas; the filming was witnessed by a Texan journalist who later wrote a 1974 Texas Monthly article about it. Lumet directed this film during a span when his Serpico, Murder on the Orient Express, Dog Day Afternoon and Network were nominated for a combined 24 Academy Awards. McMurtry has claimed to have hated the movie as it wasn't very true to his book and says that it "just about killed his father."

Plot
Over a span of nearly 40 years, Gid and Johnny, a pair of Texas farm boys, compete for the affections of Molly Taylor, a free spirit who cares for both of them. The story is told in three consecutive segments, each narrated by one of the three lead roles.

The first segment is set in 1925 and narrated by Gid, who introduces himself as well as his best friend Johnny and Johnny's girlfriend Molly Taylor with whom Gid becomes smitten. Gid works part-time as a ranch hand at Molly's farm and often competes against Johnny for Molly's affections. Despite their frequent feud and arguments, Gid and Johnny's friendship never ends during their excursions and errands for Molly's father to sell and buy cattle for the family farm. Molly eventually sleeps with Gid, as well as Johnny, but she eventually chooses neither one of them and instead marries school friend Eddie after the death of her father. Gid eventually marries Sarah, a local widow with several children, and Johnny leaves town for places unknown.

The second segment is set in 1945 and is narrated by Molly. It was revealed that Molly had three sons from her three different suitors, and each one of them died in combat during World War II which is currently waging. Molly's husband Eddie also died from an illness several years before. Gid had divorced Sarah and began spending most of his free time with Molly, who withheld the news of their son's death in battle. When he finally did learn the news, Gid took it badly and became more depressed. Johnny re-entered their lives after living away and, having had married and divorced his own wife, took a more active part in helping Molly run her late father's farm.

The third and final segment is set in 1964 and is narrated by Johnny. He reveals that Gid is in a local hospital dying from cancer and Johnny has been keeping a bedside vigil over him. Wanting out of the place, Johnny takes Gid away from the hospital for a few days to visit Molly who is still living at her father's farm and is contemplating selling it. After working with Johnny around the farm to relive their "good old days" long gone by, Gid passes away as Johnny is taking him back to the hospital. After Gid's funeral, Johnny meets with Molly where they agree and despite they never got married or had a life in operating her family farm, they will always be soul mates before Johnny leaves Molly for the last time.

Cast
Anthony Perkins as Gid Frye
Beau Bridges as Johnny
Blythe Danner as Molly Taylor
Susan Sarandon as Sarah
Edward Binns as Mr. Frye
Conard Fowkes as Eddie White
Claude Traverse as Mr. Taylor
John Henry Faulk as Mr. Grinsom
Richard Ray Lee as Sheriff (uncredited)
Paul A. Partain as Willy (uncredited)

See also
 List of American films of 1974

References

External links
Leavin' McMurtry, a March 1974 article from Texas Monthly magazine
Interview with Paul Partain, commenting on the film
 
 
 

1974 films
1974 drama films
American drama films
Columbia Pictures films
1970s English-language films
Films directed by Sidney Lumet
Films set in Texas
Films shot in Texas
Films set in 1925
Films set in 1945
Films set in 1964
Films based on American novels
1970s American films